David Leslie Clarke (born 24 July 1949) is an English former footballer who made 15 appearances in the Football League playing for Doncaster Rovers and Darlington. A goalkeeper, Clark began his career with Newcastle United without representing them in the league, and went on to play non-league football for clubs including South Shields, Gateshead United and Blyth Spartans.

Clarke spent more than ten years with Spartans, kept goal in their run to the fifth round of the 1977–78 FA Cup, and was capped 16 times for England at semi-professional level. He also briefly managed the club.

References

1949 births
Living people
Footballers from Newcastle upon Tyne
English footballers
England semi-pro international footballers
Association football goalkeepers
Newcastle United F.C. players
Doncaster Rovers F.C. players
Darlington F.C. players
South Shields F.C. (1936) players
Gateshead F.C. players
Blyth Spartans A.F.C. players
English Football League players
Northern Football League players